Van Hackett was a weekend news anchor for KTRK-TV in Houston, Texas from 1980 to 1987. He also co-anchored the station's Live at Five newscast for a few years before being moved to the weekends. Prior to joining KTRK-TV, Hackett was the assistant news director for WPTV-TV in West Palm Beach, Florida from 1973 until 1976. He later left KTRK-TV during the summer of 1987 and joined 1010 WINS Radio in New York City, New York for a few years before joining WWOR-TV in Secaucus, New Jersey as well as anchoring at WVIT-TV in New Britain, Connecticut until his resignation in 1993.

References

American television news anchors
American radio journalists
Living people
Year of birth missing (living people)